Kyle Marcelli (born 23 February 1990) is a Canadian racing driver who currently competes in the Michelin Pilot Challenge.

Career
Marcelli began his racing career in karts in 2005, before moving into single seaters for the 2006 Bridgestone F2000 Racing Series, in which he finished second. In December 2014, Marcelli was a part of the Davidson Racing team that won the yearly 25 Hours of Thunderhill, driving a Norma prototype chassis alongside co-drivers Randy Pobst, Alex Lloyd, and Brian Frisselle. For the following Continental Tire Sports Car Challenge season, Marcelli signed with Mantella Autosport. He would spend just one season with the team, joining Performance Tech Motorsports for the full WeatherTech SportsCar Championship season in 2016. The following season would see Marcelli take on SprintX races in the Pirelli World Challenge for R.Ferri Motorsport. Driving for KohR Motorsports, Marcelli won the 2020 Michelin Pilot Challenge GS class championship.

Racing record

Complete American Le Mans Series results
(key) (Races in bold indicate pole position)

Complete Grand-Am Rolex Sports Car Series results
(key) (Races in bold indicate pole position)

Complete WeatherTech SportsCar Championship results
(key) (Races in bold indicate pole position)

NASCAR
(key) (Bold – Pole position awarded by qualifying time. Italics – Pole position earned by points standings or practice time. * – Most laps led.)

Pinty's Series

References

External links
Personal Website
Kyle Marcelli at Motorsport.com

1990 births
Living people
24 Hours of Daytona drivers
Canadian racing drivers
Racing drivers from Ontario
Sportspeople from Scarborough, Toronto
WeatherTech SportsCar Championship drivers
Wayne Taylor Racing drivers
Starworks Motorsport drivers
Michelin Pilot Challenge drivers
24H Series drivers
American Le Mans Series drivers
Rolex Sports Car Series drivers
Porsche Carrera Cup Germany drivers
Andretti Autosport drivers